Vanuatu competed at the 2014 Summer Youth Olympics, in Nanjing, China from 16 August to 28 August 2014.

Athletics

Vanuatu qualified one athlete.

Qualification Legend: Q=Final A (medal); qB=Final B (non-medal); qC=Final C (non-medal); qD=Final D (non-medal); qE=Final E (non-medal)

Boys
Track & road events

Beach Volleyball

Vanuatu was given a team to compete from the tripartite committee.

Football

Vanuatu will compete in the boys' tournament.

Boys' Tournament

Roster

 Jules Bororoa
 Johnny Iwai
 William Kai
 Waiwo Kalmet
 Rufare Kalsal
 Rene Kuse
 Samuel Namatak
 Benson Rarua
 Leo Rau
 Terrence Roberts
 Lauren Saurei
 Dick Seth
 Zolostino Tanghwa
 Brian Taut
 Jelson Toara
 Micah Tommy
 Ronaldo Wilkins
 Vira Womal

Group Stage

Placement 5–6

References

2014 in Vanuatuan sport
Nations at the 2014 Summer Youth Olympics
Vanuatu at the Youth Olympics